"The Ruin" is an elegy in Old English, written by an unknown author probably in the 8th or 9th century, and published in the 10th century in the Exeter Book, a large collection of poems and riddles. The poem evokes the former glory of an unnamed ruined ancient city that some scholars have identified with modern Bath, juxtaposing the grand, lively past with the decaying present.

The manuscript

The extant poem consists of forty-nine lines in the Exeter Book, on folios 123b-124b between "Husband's Message" and 34 preceding riddles.  It is written near the end of the manuscript, on both sides of the leaf.  A large diagonal burn in the centre of the page has rendered part of the script illegible.

Contents

The unknown poet compares the ruins that were extant at the time of writing with the mighty structures, since destroyed by fate, that had once stood there. The desolate and lichen-grey stones of the poet's time are linked to their long-gone mighty builders and to the wealth and activity of their heyday.

The poem and a version in modern English

{|class="wikitable"
|-
| bgcolor=#f3f9ff colspan="2" |

|-
! Original Old English !! Modern English
|-
|
Wrætlic is þes wealstan,     wyrde gebræcon; 
burgstede burston,     brosnað enta geweorc.
Hrofas sind gehrorene,     hreorge torras,
hrungeat berofen, hrim on lime,
scearde scurbeorge     scorene, gedrorene,
ældo undereotone.     Eorðgrap hafað
waldend wyrhtan     forweorone, geleorene,
heardgripe hrusan,     oþ hund cnea
werþeoda gewitan.     Oft þæs wag gebad 
ræghar ond readfah     rice æfter oþrum, 
ofstonden under stormum;     steap geap gedreas.
Wunað giet se     ...num geheapen, 
fel on
grimme gegrunden
scan     heo... 
...g orþonc     ærsceaft 
...g     lamrindum beag 
mod mo...     ...yne swiftne gebrægd 
hwætred in hringas,     hygerof gebond 
weallwalan wirum     wundrum togædre. 
Beorht wæron burgræced,     burnsele monige,
heah horngestreon,     heresweg micel,
meodoheall monig     mondreama full,
oþþæt þæt onwende     wyrd seo swiþe. 
Crungon walo wide,     cwoman woldagas,
swylt eall fornom     secgrofra wera; 
wurdon hyra wigsteal     westen staþolas,
brosnade burgsteall.     Betend crungon 
hergas to hrusan.     Forþon þas hofu dreorgiað,
ond þæs teaforgeapa     tigelum sceadeð
hrostbeages hrof.     Hryre wong gecrong 
gebrocen to beorgum,     þær iu beorn monig 
glædmod ond goldbeorht     gleoma gefrætwed,
wlonc ond wingal     wighyrstum scan; 
seah on sinc, on sylfor,     on searogimmas,
on ead, on æht,     on eorcanstan, 
on þas beorhtan burg     bradan rices. 
Stanhofu stodan,     stream hate wearp
widan wylme;     weal eall befeng 
beorhtan bosme,     þær þa baþu wæron, 
hat on hreþre.     þæt wæs hyðelic.
Leton þonne geotan 
ofer harne stan     hate streamas
un... 
...þþæt hringmere     hate 
þær þa baþu wæron.
þonne is
...re;     þæt is cynelic þing, 
huse ......     burg.... 
|
This masonry is wondrous;     fates broke it 
courtyard pavements were smashed;     the work of giants is decaying.
Roofs are fallen,      ruinous towers,
the frosty gate     with frost on cement is ravaged,
chipped roofs are torn,     fallen,
undermined by old age.     The grasp of the earth possesses
the mighty builders,     perished and fallen,
the hard grasp of earth,     until a hundred generations
of people have departed.     Often this wall,
lichen-grey and stained with red,     experienced one reign after another,
remained standing under storms;     the high wide gate has collapsed.
Still the masonry endures     in winds cut down
persisted on__
fiercely sharpened     _
__     she shone_
_g skill     ancient work_
_g     of crusts of mud turned away
spirit moyne     put together keen-counselled
a quick design in rings,     a most intelligent one bound
the wall with wire brace     wondrously together.
Bright were the castle buildings,     many the bathing-halls,
high the abundance of gables,     great the noise of the multitude,
many a meadhall     full of festivity,
until Fate the mighty     changed that.
Far and wide the slain perished,     days of pestilence came,
death took     all the brave men away;
their places of war     became deserted places,
the city decayed.     The rebuilders perished,
the armies to earth.     And so these buildings grow desolate,
and this red-curved roof     parts from its tiles
of the ceiling-vault.     The ruin has fallen to the ground
broken into mounds,     where at one time many a warrior,
joyous and ornamented     with gold-bright splendour,
proud and flushed with wine     shone in war-trappings;
looked at treasure, at silver,     at precious stones,
at wealth, at prosperity,     at jewellery,
at this bright castle     of a broad kingdom.
The stone buildings stood,     a stream threw up heat
in wide surge;     the wall enclosed all
in its bright bosom,     where the baths were,
hot in the heart.     That was convenient.
Then they let pour___
hot streams over grey stone.
un___     _
until the ringed sea (circular pool?)     hot
_where the baths were.
Then is___
__re,      that is a noble thing,
to the house__     castle___
|-
|}

Modern literary criticism

Setting

One of the main arguments that surround the poem is that of which city is depicted in the poem. Heinrich Leo first suggested in 1865 that the city depicted was the city of Bath. Others have suggested Chester, Hadrian's Wall, Babylon of the Apocalypse, or that it does not describe any one city in particular.  However, the general consensus among analysts has been that Bath was the city the author was describing throughout the poem.  There are three features distinctly referred to in the poem that when used conjunctively could only be in the city of Bath: the hot spring mentioned at the end of the poem (as opposed to artificially heated water), the mention that there were many bathing halls, and the mention of a circular pool also at the end of the poem. Furthermore, the description of the decay matches Bath's probable appearance in the first half of the eighth century.

Themes

Although the poem appears a straightforward description of the visual appearance of the site, the author's non-Roman assumptions about the kind of activities that the building would have sheltered, and their emotional state concerning the decay of the ruins, allow different interpretations to be brought forth.  William Johnson sees the poem not as a reflection of the physical appearance of the site but rather an evocative effort to bring "stone ruins and human beings into polar relationship as symbolic reflections of each other." Johnson further sees the poem as a metaphor for human existence, a demonstration that all beauty must come to an end.  From this perspective, the author of "The Ruin" could be describing the downfall of the Roman Empire by showing its once great and beautiful structure reduced to rubble just as the empire was.  Similarly, Alain Renoir points to the author's use of the word "wyrde," meaning "fate," as the reason for the buildings' decay, implying the inevitable transience of man-made things: "that all human splendor, like human beings themselves, is doomed to destruction and oblivion."

Where "The Ruin" can be seen from a sentimental perspective, it may also be viewed from an imagistic perspective.  Arnold Talentino sees the poem as not a sorrowful lamentation, but as an angry or realistic condemnation of the actual people who wrought the destruction.  This interpretation would be more historically realistic in that it would reflect a very Christian view of the destruction, a common theme in Old English poems. Talentino states, "His [the author's] view of what once was and his thoughts about it indicate that the city's former inhabitants caused its fall, that crumbling walls are, in part at least, the effect of a crumbling social structure."

"The Ruin" shares the melancholic worldview of some of its contemporary poems such as The Seafarer, The Wanderer and Deor. But unlike "The Wanderer" and other elegies, "The Ruin" does not employ the ubi sunt formula. Renoir and R.F. Leslie also note that while "The Wanderer" has a moral purpose, "The Ruin" has a detached tone.

Influence

Modern musical settings 

An alternative rendition of the poem in Modern English, was set by Peter Hammill to music as the song "Imperial Walls", on his 1979 album pH7. Another version, by Michael Alexander, was set by Nicholas Maw as his piece 'The Ruin' for double eight-part chorus and solo horn. Michael Alexander's translation was also used in both Paul Keenan's The Ruin and A Field of Scarecrows. An excerpt of the poem set to ambient music is featured in the 2010 BBC documentary "Requiem for Detroit."  In 2016 Oscar Bettison set the poem, in Old English, in his piece "Presence of Absence".

See also
List of literary descriptions of cities (before 1550)

References

Further reading 
Anglo-Saxon poetry: an anthology of Old English poems tr. S. A. J. Bradley. London: Dent, 1982 (Translation into English prose).
The Earliest English Poems tr. Michael Alexander. Penguin Classics. (Translation into English verse).
Doubleday, James . "The Ruin: Structure and Theme." Journal of English and Germanic Philology. 71.3 (1972): 369-381. Print.
Leslie, R.F. Three Old English Elegies. Manchester: The University Press, 1961.

External links 
The Ruin in a 1922  Anglo-Saxon and Norse poems anthology edited by N. Chadwick and hosted at the Internet Archive 
Old English Text
verse translation by Bob Hasenfratz in the Old English Poetry Project
Translation into Modern English by medievalist Richard Fahey
 Michael D. C. Drout, 'The Ruin', Anglo-Saxon Aloud (12 November 2007) (performed from the Anglo-Saxon Poetic Records edition)

Old English poems
Culture in Bath, Somerset
Works of unknown authorship